The Pasargad Football Club is a Filipino football and futsal club.  The team played in the former United Football League which was the highest level of club football in the Philippines. It remains competing in the Philippine Futsal League.

History

Foundation and early years

Pasargad F.C. started in 1996 when a group of football enthusiasts decided to form a team. Initially, the team consisted mostly of Iranians, a few Africans and some Filipinos that joined to play the game.  The team eventually consisted of players from the national team and different collegiate teams with its core base of Iranian players.

Pasargad was named after the capital of former Persian emperor Cyrus the Great (that has been named a UNESCO World Heritage Site).

The club was originally part of inaugural Filipino Premier League in 2008. They finished fourth in the league table, however the league was discontinued after the first season.

On 16 October 2010, they joined 2010 UFL Cup where they finished third in group A and were eventually eliminated. They lost to Loyola in the plate finals (a ranking match for a spot in the UFL Division 1).

2013–present

The club made a good run in the 2013 PFF National Men's Club Championship and reached the finals. They lost to Ceres in a 1–0 scoreline.

In April 2013, Pasargad FC competed in the qualification round of 2013 AFC Futsal Club Championship as the Philippine Football Federation representative in the tournament.

In January 2014, Ayi Aryee Nii assumed as Pasargad's head coach, which was previously the job of club president Esmaeil Sedigh.

In March 2014, Ayi Aryee Nii was replaced by Mike Agbayani.

In 2016, Agbayani was replaced by former Kaya F.C. assistant coach Joel Villarino.

Notable players
The following were notable players that played for Pasargad and have played for a national team.

 Misagh Bahadoran 
 Yannick Tuason 
 Ariel Zerrudo 
 Arash Ostovari

Records

Key
Tms. = Number of teams
Pos. = Position in league
Prom = Promoted
TBD  = To be determined
DNQ  = Did not qualify
Note: Performances of the club indicated here was after the UFL created (as a semi-pro league) in 2009.

International club futsal

Honors

Football
 PFF National Men's Club Championship
Runners-up (1): 2013

 Filipino Premier League
Second Runners-up (1): 2008

Futsal
 Philippine Futsal League
'''Champions (2): 2011, 2012

References

Football clubs in the Philippines
Association football clubs established in 1996
1996 establishments in the Philippines
Sports teams in Metro Manila
Diaspora sports clubs
Iranian association football clubs outside Iran